The 1964 National League was the 30th season and the nineteenth post-war season of the highest tier of motorcycle speedway in Great Britain, but the final season of the National League being the highest tier.

Summary
West Ham Hammers returned after a nine-year absence but the league stayed at seven competitors with the withdrawal of Southampton Saints. Oxford Cheetahs, who had finished bottom of the table in 1963, rose spectacularly up the league to win the title, a repeat of the feat they had accomplished at a lower level in 1950.

Final table

On account of the small number of teams in the league meeting each other only once home and away, the Britannia Shield was run in a league format. Oxford Cheetahs came out on top.

Britannia Shield table

Top Ten Riders (League only)

National Trophy
The 1964 National Trophy was the 26th edition of the Knockout Cup. Oxford were the winners.

First round

Semi-finals

a=abandoned after 10 heats

Final

Second leg

Oxford Cheetahs were declared National Trophy Champions, winning on aggregate 85-83.

See also
 List of United Kingdom Speedway League Champions
 Knockout Cup (speedway)

References

Speedway National League
1964 in speedway
1964 in British motorsport